, also known as Battle Mania 2, is a horizontal side-scrolling shoot'em-up released by Vic Tokai for the Mega Drive in 1993. It serves as a sequel to the original Battle Mania, which was released in North America under the title Trouble Shooter. Unlike the original Battle Mania, Daginjō was released exclusively in Japan.

Battle Mania Daiginjō had a limited print run of this title and it is very difficult to find in complete condition with box and instructions; consequently, it is one of the most expensive Sega Mega Drive games today.

Gameplay
Battle Mania Daiginjō builds on the first release by introducing several improved features including tweaked weapon system where players now have more options to choose from for how they want to play the game. The game's pace has been significantly altered within the difficulty and the length of the stages. Uncommon to most shooter games, Daiginjō uses both vertical and horizontal scrolling for its stages. It has nine levels altogether, three more than its predecessor.

Reception
Chris Rasa from Hardcore Gaming 101 described the game as "one of the best shooters available on the Mega Drive."

References

External links 

 Battle Mania spanish review

1993 video games
Japan-exclusive video games
Scrolling shooters
Sega Genesis-only games
Sega Genesis games
Vic Tokai games
Video games developed in Japan
Video games featuring female protagonists
Single-player video games